Henry Francis Grady (February 12, 1882 – September 14, 1957) was an American diplomat.  Born in San Francisco, California, to John Henry and Ellen Genevieve (Rourke) Grady, he earned a PhD in economics from Columbia University.  On October 18, 1917, he married Lucretia Louise del Valle (daughter of California State Senator Reginaldo Francisco del Valle and Helen M. (White) del Valle, and granddaughter of Ygnacio del Valle).  Grady's daughter, Patricia Louise Grady, was born in Paris, France, May 11, 1920, and died May 28, 2000, in Asheville, Buncombe, North Carolina.  On August 24, 1942, she married diplomat John Paton Davies, Jr.

Early career
Grady worked at the US Commerce Department in economics as an aide to Secretary Herbert Hoover in 1921.  He was the dean, College of Commerce at the UC Berkeley from 1928 to 1937.  He became president of the shipping company American President Lines in 1941, remaining there until 1947.

Diplomatic career

In October 1945, he was appointed by US President Harry S. Truman as his personal representative to the Allied commission supervising elections in Greece because of the volatile situation created by the Greek Civil War.
 
In July 1946, Grady, together with British Deputy Prime Minister Herbert Morrison, proposed the "Morrison-Grady Plan," a proposal for the solution of the Palestine problem that called for federalization under overall British trusteeship. Ultimately, the plan was rejected by both Arabs and Jews.

Grady was the first US Ambassador to India, serving from 1947 to 1948 (concurrently US Ambassador to Nepal 1948). He was then appointed as US Ambassador to Greece from 1948 to 1950, and US Ambassador to Iran 1950–1951.

He was a member of the Pacific-Union Club in San Francisco, California, and of the Family Club.

Death
He died September 14, 1957, on board the SS President Wilson, Pacific Ocean, from heart failure and was buried in Holy Cross Cemetery, Colma, California.

References

External links
 
 

Ambassadors of the United States to India
Ambassadors of the United States to Greece
Ambassadors of the United States to Iran
1882 births
1957 deaths
Ambassadors of the United States to Nepal
20th-century American diplomats